In Ancient Greek mythology, Maniae or Mania are the spirits personifying insanity, madness, and crazed frenzy. They operate closely with Lyssa, the spirit of rage and rabies, and like Lyssa, are presumed to be daughters of Nyx.  They are also associated with the Erinyes, the three fearsome goddesses of vengeance.

They are also sometimes said (though, perhaps in jest, or as a metaphor for love's sometimes cruel nature) to have been nurses of the god Eros.

Mythology 
Pausanias writes that on the road from Megalopolis to Messene there was a sanctuary, which, according to local citizens, was devoted to goddesses called Maniae, and that its surrounding district was also called Maniae (Μανίας). His local sources told him that it was there that madness overtook Orestes, hence Pausanias's view that these Maniae were the vengeful Furies or Erinyes or Eumenides (Graceful Ones).

Note

References 

 Pausanias, Description of Greece with an English Translation by W.H.S. Jones, Litt.D., and H.A. Ormerod, M.A., in 4 Volumes. Cambridge, MA, Harvard University Press; London, William Heinemann Ltd. 1918. . Online version at the Perseus Digital Library
 Pausanias, Graeciae Descriptio. 3 vols. Leipzig, Teubner. 1903.  Greek text available at the Perseus Digital Library.

Greek goddesses
Personifications in Greek mythology
Insanity